Truth to Promises is the debut album by Heavy/Power metal band Symphorce.

Track listing
"Truth to Promises" – 4:32
"Drifted" – 4:57
"Wounded" – 4:18
"Retracing the Line" – 3:34
"Stronghold" – 3:57
"Across the Plains" – 4:27
"Forevermore" – 5:15
"Pouring Rain" – 4:18
"Circles Are Broken" – 6:37
"Sea of Life" – 7:56
"Yap over Bamis" (bonus track) – 4:01

Credits

Band members
Andy B. Franck – lead & back up vocals
Stef Bertolla – guitar
H. Peter Walter – keyboards
Mike Hammer – bass
Stefan Köllner – drums

Production
Rüdiger Gerndt, Jörg Umbreit – co-producers, engineers, mixing
Dennis Ward – drums recording and mixing

References

1999 debut albums
Symphorce albums
Noise Records albums